Leo Sullivan may refer to:

Leo J. Sullivan (1905–1963), American politician from Massachusetts
Leo D. Sullivan (fl. 1972–1992), American animator and director

See also
 Lee Sullivan
 Leon Sullivan